Ganci is an Italian surname. Notable people with the surname include:

 Peter J. Ganci, Jr. (1946–2001), American firefighter
 Raffaele Ganci (1932–2022), Sicilian Mafiosi
 Marco Ganci (born 1976), Italian clergyman and diplomat
 Massimo Ganci (born 1981) Italian footballer

Italian-language surnames